Nivea is the debut studio album by American R&B singer Nivea. It was released by Jive and Arista Records on September 25, 2001. A contemporary R&B album with major influences of  the pop and hip hop genres, Nivea worked with a wide range of producers and songwriters on her self-titled album which features credits by Leslie Braithwaite, Bryan-Michael Cox, Roy "Royalty" Hamilton, R. Kelly, The Neptunes, Organized Noise, Adonis Shropshire, Teedra Moses, Johnta Austin, and Ne-Yo, among others.

Upon its release, Nivea debuted at number 80 on the US Billboard 200 and number 35 on the Top R&B/Hip-Hop Albums. The album was preceded by its first two singles "Don't Mess with the Radio", which became a top twenty hit in Australia, and "Don't Mess With My Man", a collaboration with Brandon Casey and Brian Casey from boy group Jagged Edge, which became a smash hit, reaching the top ten in France, New Zealand and on the US Billboard Hot 100.

Singles
"Don't Mess with the Radio" was selected as Nivea's solo debut single and was released on June 12, 2001. While not a major hit in the United States or most other countries, it was a top-twenty success in Australia, reaching number 14 on the ARIA Singles Chart. In April 2002, the song was released in the United Kingdom as a double A-side with "Run Away (I Wanna Be with U)". It peaked at number 48 on the UK Singles Chart. In Australia, "Run Away" was released as the album's second single on December 10, 2001.

"Don't Mess with My Man" was released on June 3, 2002, as the third single from the album. The song peaked at number eight on the US Billboard Hot 100 and was an international hit as well, reaching the top 10 in France and New Zealand and receiving a Gold certification in the former country. In the United Kingdom, the song reached number 41 on the UK Singles Chart upon its initial release. The recording earned the artists a nomination for Best R&B Performance by a Duo or Group with Vocals at the 45th Grammy Awards in 2003.

The fourth single, "Laundromat", was released on April 28, 2003.<ref> Note: The source misprints "Don't Mess with My Man" as "Don't Mess with the Radio".</ref> The song peaked in the United States at number 58 on the Billboard Hot 100 and number 20 on the Hot R&B/Hip-Hop Songs chart. Internationally, it reached a peak number 33 on the UK Singles Chart as a double A-side with "Don't Mess with My Man".

Critical reception

Alex Henderson from AllMusic rated Nivea'' three out of five stars and called it "a perfect example of how hip-hop-drenched R&B [had] become" by 2001: "From the production to the lyrics, this CD frequently underscores hip-hop's influence on modern R&B." He found that "Nivea provides a likable blend of girlishness and grit on catchy, hip-hop-minded offerings", while also being "teen-friendly, although not in a bubblegum way; in Nivea's case, teen-friendly doesn't mean teen pop." Henderson concluded: "But if Nivea's debut is slightly uneven, it still has more ups than downs and is — thanks to the more on-the-ball producers and writers — worth the price of admission."

Track listing

Notes
 denotes co-producer
Sample credits
"Still in Love" samples Alicia Meyer's "Concentrate On Love".
"You Don't Even Know" samples James Brown's "The Payback". 
"Just in Case" samples Lost Boyz's "Renee".
"Never Had a Girl Like Me" samples Lyn Collins's "Think (About It)". 
"25 Reasons" samples Blu's "Clap Your Hands". 
"Check Your Man" samples James Brown's "It's A Man's Man's Man's World".

Personnel
Credits are taken from the album's liner notes.

Instruments and performances

 Donnie Lyle – guitar
 Charles Pettaway – guitar
 Malachy Robinson – guitar
 Swift C – drums
 PJ Morton – piano, keyboards
 R. Kelly – arranger

Production

 Ted Bishop – engineering, instrumentation
 Leslie Braithwaite – engineering, mixing
 Tom Coyne – mastering
 Ryan Freeland – engineering
 Andy Gallas – engineering
 Jeffrey Gamble – photography
 Elisa Garcia – design
 Abel Garibaldi – engineering
 Serban Ghenea – mixing
 Jay Goin – engineering
 Mark Goodchild – engineering
 Hachi – photography
 Chaz Harper – mastering
 R. Kelly – mixing
 C.L. Lampkin – backing vocals
 Ian Mereness – engineering, mixing
 Rowie Nameri – engineering
 Azuolas Sinkevicius – engineering
 Brian Stanley – engineering
 Adonis Shropshire – engineering
 Richard Travali – mixing
 Patrick Viala – mixing
 Bernasky Wall – mixing
 Arnold Wolfe – mixing

Charts

Release history

References

2001 debut albums
Albums produced by Bryan-Michael Cox
Albums produced by Organized Noize
Albums produced by the Neptunes
Albums produced by R. Kelly
Nivea (singer) albums